Cimarron Township may refer to:

Kansas 
 Cimarron Township, Gray County, Kansas
 Cimarron Township, Meade County, Kansas, Meade County
 Cimarron Township, Morton County, Kansas, Morton County

Oklahoma 
 See list of Oklahoma townships

See also 
 Cimarron (disambiguation)

Township name disambiguation pages